is a Japanese field hockey player who plays as a forward for Japanese national team.

Personal life
Kota Watanabe studies in the College of Business Administration at Ritsumeikan University.

Career

National teams

Under–21
In 2015, Watanabe made his debut for the Japan under–21 side at the Junior Asia Cup. The team finished fourth, qualifying for the Junior World Cup.

Following the Junior Asia Cup, Watanabe represented the side again at the 2016 Junior World Cup in Lucknow, India, where the team finished in thirteenth place.

Senior national team
Kota Watanabe made his senior international debut in 2016 at the Sultan Azlan Shah Cup in Ipoh, where the team came last.

Following his debut in 2016, Watanabe has been a regular inclusion in the Japanese team. His most prominent performance came in the 2018, at the Asian Games in Jakarta. At the tournament, the team won a gold medal, qualifying directly to the 2020 Summer Olympics in Tokyo.

Adelaide Fire
In 2019, Watanabe was signed to the Adelaide Fire hockey team to compete in the inaugural tournament of the Sultana Bran Hockey One League, Australia's new premier domestic competition.

References

External links
 
 
 
 

1996 births
Living people
Japanese male field hockey players
Male field hockey forwards
Field hockey players at the 2020 Summer Olympics
Olympic field hockey players of Japan
Field hockey players at the 2018 Asian Games
Asian Games medalists in field hockey
Medalists at the 2018 Asian Games
Asian Games gold medalists for Japan
Expatriate field hockey players
Japanese expatriate sportspeople in Australia
Sportspeople from Fukui Prefecture
21st-century Japanese people